The 2022 Women's Sultana Bran Hockey One was the second season of Hockey Australia's national league, Hockey One. The tournament was held across 7 states and territories of Australia. Competition commenced on 29 September, and culminated with a finals weekend running from 19 to 20 November, held in Bendigo, Victoria.

NSW Pride won the tournament for the first time, defeating the Brisbane Blaze 3–1 in penalties after the final finished as a 2–2 draw. Perth Thundersticks claimed third place after defeating HC Melbourne 3–0.

Competition format

Format
The 2022 Hockey One season followed the same format as season one. Teams will play a series of home and away matches during the Pool Stage, which will be followed by a Classification Round.

During the pool stage, teams played each other once in either a home or a way fixture. The top four ranked teams qualified for the classification round, playing in two semi-finals with the winners contesting the final and losers the third place match. Unlike season one, where Team 1 hosted Team 4 and Team 2 hosted Team 3, the finals were held over a single weekend at a central location.

Rules
In addition to FIH sanctioned rules, Hockey Australia is implementing the following rules for Hockey One:

 When a field goal or penalty stroke is scored the same athlete will have an automatic one-on-one shootout with the goalkeeper for an extra goal.
 Outright winner: There will be no drawn games. In the event of a draw, teams will contest a penalty shoot-out to determine a winner.

Point allocation
Match points will be distributed as follows:

 5 points: win
 3 points: shoot-out win
 2 points: shoot-out loss
 0 points: loss

Participating teams
The seven teams competing in the league come from Australia's states and territories, with the Northern Territory being the only team absent.

Head Coach: Jason Butcher

Linzi Appleyard
Chloe Carter
Kelsey Bing (GK)
Kate Holland-Smith
Holly Evans-Gill (C)
Lucy Holland-Smith
Carly Hoffman
Lucy Sharman
Sarah Harrison
Jane Claxton
Juliet Mallinson
Siennah Cowles
Erin Cameron
Gabrielle Nance
Harriet Shand
Michaela Spano
Isabella Gill
Kirra-Lee Pavy
Amy Hammond (GK)
Julia King

Head Coach: Nikki Taylor

Savannah Fitzpatrick
Ambrosia Malone
Casey Dolkens
Ashlea Fey
Dayle Dolkens
Morgan Gallagher (C)
Hannah Cullum-Sanders
Laney Smith
Jade Smith
Tatum Stewart
Rebecca Greiner
Meg Pearce
Morgan Mathison
Britt Wilkinson
Ruby Harris
Claire Colwill
Kyra Livermore
Georgina West
Emily Witheyman-Crump (GK)
Jordan Bliss (GK)

Head Coach: 

Mikayla Evans
Isabelle Lovel
Madison Doar
Katie Doar
Naomi Evans
Laura Gray
Sophie Gaughan
Edwina Bone (C)
Emily Robson
Asta Johnson (GK)
Shihori Oikawa
Olivia Martin
Riley Smith
Stephanie Kindon
Mikaela Patterson
Kalindi Commerford
Sarah White
Lauren Yee
Catriona Bailey-Price
Rene Hunter (GK)

Head Coach: Phil Burrows

Bridget Laurance (GK)
Aisling Utri
Nicola Hammond
Amy Lawton
Kristina Bates
Josie Lawton
Ciara Utri
Hannah Cotter
Carly James
Rosario Villagra
Joanne Peeters
Emily Hamilton-Smith
Megan Alakus
Anna Moore
Olivia Downes
Gracie Geddes
Zali Ward
Madeleine Ratcliffe
Hannah Gravenall (C)
Rachael Lynch (GK)

Head Coach: Peter Shea

Jocelyn Bartram (GK)
Sarah Johnson
Hannah Kable
Kendelle Tait
Estelle Hughes
Grace Stewart
Greta Hayes
Emma Scriven
Tamsin Bunt
Morgan Blamey
Maddison Smith (C)
Julia Bradley
Zoe Newman (GK)
Abigail Wilson
Mariah Williams
Makayla Jones
Emma Spinks
Grace Young
Alice Arnott
Alana Kavanagh

Head Coach: Phillip Hulbert

Kate Denning
Kyra White (C)
Candyce Peacock
Georgina Dowd
Penny Squibb
Georgia Wilson
Shanea Tonkin
Sarah Byrnes
Rachel Frusher
Liné Malan
Neasa Flynn
Elizabeth Duguid (GK)
Karri Somerville
Annie Gibbs
Renee Rockliff
Aleisha Power (GK)
Jade van der Zwan
Anna Roberts
Brittney Desilva
Jolie Sertorio

Head Coach: Luke Doerner

Sarah McCambridge (C)
Jillian Wolgemuth
Hannah Richardson
Maddison Brooks
Taylor Brooks
Raeleigh Phillips
Madeleine Murphy (C)
Cassie Sumfest
Emily Donovan
Kiah Williams
Eliza Westland
Louise Maddocks
Brooke DeBerdine
Lucy Cooper
Madison Clark
Grace Calvert
Beth Dobbie
Lauren Canning
<li value=23>Camila Vaughan ([[Goalkeeper (field hockey)|GK]])
<li value=25>Evelyn Dalton ([[Goalkeeper (field hockey)|GK]])

Venues

Results

Preliminary round
 Canberra Chill
|name_NSW =  NSW Pride
|name_BRI =  Brisbane Blaze
|name_ADL =  Adelaide Fire
|name_TAS =  Tassie Tigers
|name_MEL =  HC Melbourne
|name_PER =  Perth Thundersticks

|winpoints=5
|OTwinpoints=3
|OTlosspoints=2
|losspoints=0

|class_rules = 1) points; 2) matches won; 3) goal difference; 4) goals for; 5) head-to-head result; 6) field goals scored.

|res_col_header=Q
|col_Q=green1 |text_Q=Semi-finals
}}

Fixtures

|score   = 5–3
|team2   =  NSW Pride
|goals1  = A. Utri Villagra Cotter Downes 
|report  = Report
|goals2  = Stewart Williams 
|stadium = Melbourne Sports Centre, Melbourne
|umpires = Rhiannon Murrie (AUS)Nicola Brown (AUS)
}}

|score   = 2–2
|team2   =  Brisbane Blaze
|goals1  = M. Brooks 
|report  = Report
|goals2  = Fitzpatrick Malone 
|stadium = Tasmanian Hockey Centre, Hobart
|umpires = Cassidy Gallagher (AUS)Rhiannon Murrie (AUS)
|penaltyscore=3–1
|penalties1=M. Brooks Murphy Sumfest DeBerdine 
|penalties2= Cullum-Sanders Malone Fitzpatrick Wilkinson
}}

|score   = 3–1
|team2   =  Adelaide Fire
|goals1  = Somerville Malan 
|report  = Report
|goals2  = Appleyard 
|stadium = Perth Hockey Stadium, Perth
|umpires = Iris Milham (AUS)Aleisha Neumann (AUS)
}}

|score   = 2–4
|team2   =  Canberra Chill
|goals1  = J. Smith 
|report  = Report
|goals2  = K. Doar Patterson 
|stadium = Queensland State Hockey Centre, Brisbane
|umpires = Tamara Leonard (AUS)Aleisha Neumann (AUS)
}}

|score   = 0–2
|team2   =  Perth Thundersticks
|goals1  = 
|report  = Report
|goals2  = Wilson Malan 
|stadium = Melbourne Sports Centre, Melbourne
|umpires = Nicola Brown (AUS)Iris Milham (AUS)
}}

|score   = 2–0
|team2   =  Tassie Tigers
|goals1  = Carter 
|report  = Report
|goals2  = 
|stadium = MATE Stadium, Adelaide
|umpires = Kristy Robertson (AUS)Cassidy Gallagher (AUS)
}}

|score   = 0–2
|team2   =  HC Melbourne
|goals1  = 
|report  = Report
|goals2  = A. Lawton Cotter 
|stadium = National Hockey Centre, Canberra
|umpires = Emily Carroll (AUS) Kristy Robertson (AUS)
}}

|score   = 2–5
|team2   =  NSW Pride
|goals1  = Claxton 
|report  = Report
|goals2  = Stewart Jones Wilson 
|stadium = MATE Stadium, Adelaide
|umpires =  Michelle Farnill (AUS) Rhiannon Murrie (AUS)
}}

|score   = 0–3
|team2   =  Brisbane Blaze
|goals1  = 
|report  = Report
|goals2  = Stewart Cullum-Sanders 
|stadium = Perth Hockey Stadium, Perth
|umpires = Nicola Brown (AUS)Aleisha Neumann (AUS)
}}

|score   = 0–3
|team2   =  Canberra Chill
|goals1  = 
|report  = Report
|goals2  = Kindon Oikawa M. Doar 
|stadium = Tasmanian Hockey Centre, Hobart
|umpires = Rhiannon Murrie (AUS)Nicola Brown (AUS)
}}

|score   = 2–0
|team2   =  Perth Thundersticks
|goals1  = M. Smith 
|report  = Report
|goals2  = 
|stadium = Sydney Olympic Park, Sydney
|umpires = Cassidy Gallagher (AUS)Michelle Farnill (AUS)
}}

|score   = 1–2
|team2   =  HC Melbourne
|goals1  = Stewart 
|report  = Report
|goals2  = Cotter J. Lawton 
|stadium = Queensland State Hockey Centre, Brisbane
|umpires = Aleisha Neumann (AUS)Deborah O'Connell (AUS)
}}

|score   = 1–0
|team2   =  Adelaide Fire
|goals1  = Reid 
|report  = Report
|goals2  = 
|stadium = National Hockey Centre, Canberra
|umpires = Kristy Robertson (AUS)Emily Carroll (AUS)
}}

|score   = 1–4
|team2   =  Brisbane Blaze
|goals1  = Stewart 
|report  = Report
|goals2  = Cullum-Sanders Fitzpatrick 
|stadium = Sydney Olympic Park, Sydney
|umpires = Michelle Farnill (AUS)Kerryl Brown (AUS)
}}

|score   = 3–0
|team2   =  Tassie Tigers
|goals1  = Wilson Tonkin 
|report  = Report
|goals2  = 
|stadium = Perth Hockey Stadium, Perth
|umpires = Tamara Leonard (AUS)Nicola Brown (AUS)
}}

|score   = 1–4
|team2   =  HC Melbourne
|goals1  = Mallinson 
|report  = Report
|goals2  = Bates A. Lawton Cotter 
|stadium = MATE Stadium, Adelaide
|umpires = Kerryl Brown (AUS)Deborah O'Connell (AUS)
}}

|score   = 0–5
|team2   =  NSW Pride
|goals1  = 
|report  = Report
|goals2  = Wilson Arnott Blamey Jones 
|stadium = Tasmanian Hockey Centre, Hobart
|umpires = Rhiannon Murrie (AUS)Cassidy Gallagher (AUS)
}}

|score   = 1–3
|team2   =  Perth Thundersticks
|goals1  = Commerford 
|report  = Report
|goals2  = Dowd Squibb 
|stadium = National Hockey Centre, Canberra
|umpires = Kristy Robertson (AUS)Emily Carroll (AUS)
}}

|score   = 10–3
|team2   =  Tassie Tigers
|goals1  = Ratcliffe Downes Peeters 
|report  = Report
|goals2  = Cooper M. Brooks 
|stadium = Melbourne Sports Centre, Melbourne
|umpires = Iris Milham (AUS)Nicola Brown (AUS)
}}

|score   = 2–0
|team2   =  Adelaide Fire
|goals1  = Stewart Cullum-Sanders 
|report  = Report
|goals2  = 
|stadium = Queensland State Hockey Centre, Brisbane
|umpires = Kerryl Brown (AUS)Tamara Leonard (AUS)
}}

|score   = 6–0
|team2   =  Canberra Chill
|goals1  = Stewart Blamey Arnott 
|report  = Report
|goals2  = 
|stadium = McGlynn Sporting Complex, Parkes
|umpires = Kristy Robertson (AUS)Cassidy Gallagher (AUS)
}}

Classification round
 HC Melbourne|0| Brisbane Blaze|1
|19 November 2022| NSW Pride|1| Perth Thundersticks|0

|20 November 2022| Brisbane Blaze|2 (1)| NSW Pride (pen.)|2 (3)

|20 November 2022| HC Melbourne|0| Perth Thundersticks|3

|RD1=Semi-finals |RD2=Grand Final

|skipmatch01=no|skipmatch02=no|skipmatch03=no

|team-width=185|score-width=55|bold_winner=high
}}

Semi-finals

|score   = 1–0
|team2   =  Perth Thundersticks
|goals1  = Wilson 
|report  = Report
|goals2  = 
|stadium = Bendigo Regional Hockey Complex, Bendigo
|umpires = Nicola Brown (AUS)Tamara Leonard (AUS)
}}

|score   = 0–1
|team2   =  Brisbane Blaze
|goals1  = 
|report  = Report
|goals2  = Malone 
|stadium = Bendigo Regional Hockey Complex, Bendigo
|umpires = Aleisha Neumann (AUS)Kristy Robertson (AUS)
}}

Third and fourth place

|score   = 0–3
|team2   =  Perth Thundersticks
|goals1  = 
|report  = Report
|goals2  = Squibb Dowd Somerville 
|stadium = Bendigo Regional Hockey Complex, Bendigo
|umpires = Nicola Brown (AUS)Tamara Leonard (AUS)
}}

Final

|score   = 2–2
|team2   =  NSW Pride
|goals1  = Fitzpatrick 
|report  = Report
|goals2  = Wilson Stewart 
|stadium = Bendigo Regional Hockey Complex, Bendigo
|umpires = Aleisha Neumann (AUS)Kristy Robertson (AUS)
|penaltyscore = 1–3
|penalties1 = Colwill Malone Cullum-Sanders Fitzpatrick 
|penalties2 =  Jones Stewart Williams Hayes
}}

Awards

Final standings
 Canberra Chill
|name_NSW =  NSW Pride
|name_BRI =  Brisbane Blaze
|name_ADL =  Adelaide Fire
|name_TAS =  Tassie Tigers
|name_MEL =  HC Melbourne
|name_PER =  Perth Thundersticks

|winpoints=5
|OTwinpoints=3
|OTlosspoints=2
|losspoints=0

|result1=1st |result2=2nd |result3=3rd |result4=4th |result5=GS |result6=GS |result7=GS
|pos_NSW= |pos_BRI= |pos_PER= |split4=yes

|res_col_header=Final standing
|text_1st=Gold Medal
|text_2nd=Silver Medal
|text_3rd=Bronze Medal
|text_4th=Fourth Place
|text_GS=Eliminated inGroup Stage
}}

Goalscorers
 Grace Stewart

|6 goals=
 Hannah Cotter

|5 goals=
 Savannah Fitzpatrick
 Olivia Downes

|4 goals=
 Alice Arnott
 Abigail Wilson
 Hannah Cullum-Sanders
 Tatum Stewart
 Madeleine Ratcliffe

|3 goals=
 Makayla Jones
 Maddison Brooks
 Georgina Dowd
 Liné Malan
 Georgia Wilson

|2 goals=
 Katie Doar
 Mikaela Patterson
 Morgan Blamey
 Maddison Smith
 Ambrosia Malone
 Jade Smith
 Chloe Carter
 Jane Claxton
 Lucy Cooper
 Amy Lawton
 Joanne Peeters
 Karri Somerville
 Penny Squibb

|1 goal=
 Kalindi Commerford
 Madison Doar
 Stephanie Kindon
 Shihori Oikawa
 Laura Reid
 Mariah Williams
 Linzi Appleyard
 Juliet Mallinson
 Kristina Bates
 Josie Lawton
 Aisling Utri
 Rosario Villagra
 Shanea Tonkin
}}

References

External links
Hockey Australia
Hockey Australia Results Portal

2021
Hockey One